William Hartung (born 24 January 1995) is an Australian rules football player who plays with the North Adelaide Football Club in the South Australian National Football League (SANFL). He previously played with the Hawthorn Football Club and the North Melbourne Football Club in the Australian Football League (AFL).

Junior career
When Billy Hartung was 14 years old he set a Mornington Peninsula Junior Football League record for most goals kicked in a single game, kicking 20 goals straight while playing for the Red Hill under-14s against Dromana.
Hartung progressed to the VSFL under 18 competition and played with the Dandenong Stingrays.
Selected an All-Australian at under-18 level in 2013, Hartung attended the AFL Draft Combine in October 2013 when he ran a 16.6 beep test, breaking (future teammate) Bradley Hill’s record of 16.1.

AFL career
Hawthorn selected Hartung with pick 24 in the 2013 AFL Draft.
He started 2014 developing in the VFL playing for Hawthorn's reserve affiliate side Box Hill. Good form lead to his promotion and senior debut against . He played five consecutive games between rounds 8 and 12, before an elbow injury sustained against  in round 12 meant that he missed a month of football, he returned to the VFL. He played in Box Hill's losing Grand final side.

His dash and consistency earned him a 2015 AFL Rising Star nominee after a round seven match against .

In October 2017, Hawthorn announced they would not extend his contract for the 2018 season. In the 2017 national draft, North Melbourne selected Hartung with pick No. 77.

Hartung was again delisted by North Melbourne at the end of the 2018 season.

Post AFL
He started with VAFA Premier B club St Bedes Mentone Tigers in 2019, but played out the rest of the year with St Kilda City in the Southern league. He signed with North Adelaide for the 2020 season.

Statistics

|- style=background:#EAEAEA
| 2014 ||  || 40
| 7 || 3 || 1 || 46 || 33 || 79 || 21 || 9 || 0.4 || 0.1 || 6.6 || 4.7 || 11.3 || 3.0 || 1.3 || 0
|-
| 2015 ||  || 40
| 20 || 11 || 4 || 174 || 142 || 316 || 66 || 24 || 0.6 || 0.2 || 8.6 || 7.1 || 15.8 || 3.3 || 1.2 || 0
|- style=background:#EAEAEA
| 2016 ||  || 4
| 18 || 8 || 5 || 199 || 151 || 350 || 66 || 39 || 0.4 || 0.3 || 11.1 || 8.4 || 19.4 || 3.7 || 2.2 || 0
|-
| 2017 ||  || 4
| 18 || 5 || 7 || 211 || 186 || 397 || 99 || 29 || 0.3 || 0.4 || 11.7 || 10.3 || 22.1 || 5.5 || 1.6 || 0
|- style=background:#EAEAEA
| 2018 ||  || 39
| 13 || 6 || 4 || 109 || 117 || 226 || 48 || 35 || 0.5 || 0.3 || 8.4 || 9.0 || 17.4 || 3.7 || 2.7 || 0
|- class="sortbottom"
! colspan=3| Career
! 76 !! 33 !! 21 !! 739 !! 629 !! 1368 !! 300 !! 136 !! 0.4 !! 0.3 !! 9.7 !! 8.3 !! 18.0 !! 4.0 !! 1.8 !! 0
|}

Honours and achievements
Individual
  most promising player: 2015
 AFL Rising Star nominee: 2015
 Under 18 All-Australian team: 2013

References

External links

Hawthorn Football Club players
North Melbourne Football Club players
Box Hill Football Club players
Dandenong Stingrays players
1995 births
Living people
Australian rules footballers from Victoria (Australia)